Cecile Starr (July 14, 1921 - December 2014) was an American filmmaker, educator and author who taught and wrote about moving pictures.

She was born in Nashville, Tennessee. She married film producer Aram Boyajian in 1957. They had two children.

She was a founder and co-director of the Women's Independent Film Exchange. She conducted research for a documentary film on Mary Ellen Bute that she never completed.

In 2015, the New York Public Library held a tribute event in honor of her work.

Writings
 Experimental Animation: Origins of a New Art (1968), co-authored with Robert Russett
 Ideas on Film: A Handbook for the 16mm Film User (1971) 
 Discovering the Movies: An Illustrated Introduction to the Moving Image (1972)

Filmography
 Rembrandt and the Bible (1967)
 Islamic Carpets (1970)
 Fellow Citizen: A. Lincoln (1972)
 Richter on Film (1972)

References

1921 deaths
2014 deaths
Writers from Nashville, Tennessee
American women documentary filmmakers
20th-century American women educators
20th-century American educators
American women academics
Educators from New York City
American nonprofit chief executives
American film historians
American women historians
20th-century American historians
21st-century American historians
American women biographers
21st-century American biographers
20th-century American biographers